Video Disk Recorder (VDR) is an open-source application for Linux designed to allow any computer to function as a digital video recorder, in order to record and replay TV programming using the computer's hard drive. The computer needs to be equipped with a digital TV tuner card. VDR can also operate as an mp3 player and DVD player using available plugins. VDR uses drivers from the LinuxTV project. VDR was originally written by Klaus-Peter Schmidinger, one of the founders of CadSoft Computer GmbH and original developer of the EAGLE electronic design application. The software was originally hosted on CadSoft's server.

See also

Comparison of PVR software packages

References

Further reading
 
 
 
 
 
 
  (NB. This is the same article as published in c't 20/2003.)
 
 
 
 
 
 
 
 
 
 
 
 
 
 
 
 
 
 
 
 
 
 
 
 
  (NB. Also in LinuxUser 12/2002, p. 22.)

External links
VDR (The Video Disk Recorder) Home page Official website
VDR Wiki/English VDR Wiki

Free video software
Television technology
Television time shifting technology
Video recording software